The Fenambosy Chevron is one of four chevron-shaped land features on the southwest coast of Madagascar, near the tip of Madagascar,  high and   inland. Chevrons such as Fenambosy have been hypothesized as providing evidence of "megatsunamis" caused by comets or asteroids crashing into Earth. However, the megatsunami origin of the Fernambosy and other chevrons has been challenged by other geologists and oceanographers.

Although its sediments have not been directly sampled, cores from the area contain high levels of nickel and magnetic components that are argued to be associated with impact ejecta. Abbott estimates the age of this feature to be about 4,500 to 5,000 years old.

References

External links
Blakeslee, S., 2006, Ancient Crash, Epic Wave, The New York Times, November 14, 2006, last accessed September 28, 2014.

Geography of Madagascar
Geological hazards
Tsunami